Junction City Elementary School District is a public school district based in Trinity County, California, United States.

See also
Junction City, California

External links
 

School districts in California